Heckville is an unincorporated community located on the high plains of the Llano Estacado about  northeast of Lubbock or  north of Idalou in northeastern Lubbock County, Texas. This small town was named after Henry Heck, who built a cotton gin to serve the community in 1948.

Heckville is located at the point where Farm to Market Road 400 intersects the tracks of the former Fort Worth and Denver South Plains Railway that extended from Estelline to Lubbock. The BNSF Railway, which last owned and operated the former Fort Worth and Denver South Plains Railway, abandoned and permanently removed the tracks in 1989.

The community has never reported a population of more than 20. As of 2010, all that remains are rusting grain elevators, numerous large warehouses, the remnants of a cotton gin, an abandoned country store, and a large and still active egg farm operation that produces 180,000 eggs per day.

See also
Becton, Texas
Estacado, Texas
Llano Estacado
Mount Blanco
West Texas

References

External links

Public domain photos of the Llano Estacado

Unincorporated communities in Lubbock County, Texas
Unincorporated communities in Texas
1948 establishments in Texas